The 1964 South American Rugby Championship was the fourth edition of the competition of the leading national Rugby Union teams in South America.

The tournament was played in São Paulo, Brazil and was won by Argentina.

Standings 

{| class="wikitable"
|-
!width=165|Team
!width=40|Played
!width=40|Won
!width=40|Drawn
!width=40|Lost
!width=40|For
!width=40|Against
!width=40|Difference
!width=40|Pts
|- bgcolor=#ccffcc align=center
|align=left| 
|3||3||0||0||85||22||+63||6
|- align=center
|align=left| 
|3||1||1||1||39||54||−15||3
|- align=center
|align=left| 
|3||1||0||2||29||48||−19||2
|- align=center
|align=left| 
|3||0||1||3||32||61||−29||1
|}

Results

References
  IRB – South American Championship 1964

1964
1964 rugby union tournaments for national teams
rugby union
rugby union
rugby union
rugby union
International rugby union competitions hosted by Brazil